Velika Grabovnica may refer to:

 Velika Grabovnica (Brus), Serbia
 Velika Grabovnica (Leskovac), Serbia